A whale is a sea mammal.

Whale or The Whale may also refer to:

Places

Extraterrestrial
 Cetus, a constellation also known as "The Whale"
 Cthulhu Regio on Pluto, unofficially called Whale

United Kingdom
 Whale, Cumbria, England, a hamlet
 Whale Island, Hampshire, England

United States
 Whale Cove (Oregon)
 Whale Lake, Minnesota
 Whale Rock, Rhode Island

Elsewhere
 Bay of Whales, Ross Ice Shelf, Antarctica
 Whale Cove, Nunavut, Canada
 Whale Island, the English name of Moutohora Island in New Zealand
 Whale Island, an island in the Torres Strait, Australia
 Whale Sound, Greenland

People 
 Whale (surname)
 Brian Roberts (Australian rules footballer), an Australian football player known as "The Whale"

Arts and entertainment

Fictional entities
 Whale (improbable), a minor character in The Hitchhiker's Guide to the Galaxy
 W.H.A.L.E., a fictional vehicle in the G.I. Joe universe
 Tannin (monster), a Levantine sea monster translated as "whale" in the King James Version of the Bible
 Tobias Whale, a comic book villain
 Dale "The Whale" Biederbeck, a character from Monk

Films
 Whale (film), a 1970 Bulgarian comedy satirizing the defects of the Bulgarian economic and social structure
 The Whale (2011 film), a 2011 documentary film about a killer whale (orca) living in Nootka Sound, Canada
 The Whale (2013 film), a 2013 BBC television film about the Essex whaleship and its sinking in 1820
 The Whale (2022 film), a drama film directed by Darren Aronofsky and starring Brendan Fraser and based on the 2012 play

Literature 
 "The Whale" (poem), an Old English poem
 The Whale (play), a 2012 stage play by Samuel D. Hunter
 Moby-Dick or The Whale, an 1851 novel by Herman Melville

Music 
 Whale (band), a Swedish alternative pop rock band
 "Whale" (song), by Catatonia, 1994
 "The Whale" (Tavener), a dramatic cantata by John Tavener
 "The Whale", an instrumental by Electric Light Orchestra from Out of the Blue
 "Whales", a song by Scale the Summit from The Collective

Other uses in arts and entertainment
 "The Whale" (The Office), an episode of the US TV series The Office
 Whale (sculpture), an outdoor wooden sculpture in Cannon Beach, Oregon, US

Military
 USS Whale, ships of the US Navy
 Douglas A-3 Skywarrior, a carrier-based aircraft nicknamed "The Whale"
 Operation Whale, two aborted World War II-era German intelligence plans
 Soviet submarine S-99, the only ship of the experimental Whale class submarine

Sports 
 Chicago Whales, a professional baseball team in the Federal League in 1914 and 1915
 Connecticut Whale, a former American Hockey League team, now called the Hartford Wolf Pack
 Hartford Whalers, a former NHL franchise nicknamed "The Whale"
 Ingalls Rink, Yale University, an ice hockey rink commonly referred to as "The Whale"
 Irish Whales or "The Whales", nickname of a group of Irish and Irish-American athletes who dominated weight-throwing events in the early 20th century

Other uses
 Whale (computer virus), a malicious program
 Whale (ship), a sloop which disappeared in 1816
 A Whale, a Liberian-flagged ore-oil carrier ship
 Whale (gambling) or high roller, a gambler who consistently wagers large amounts of money
 Naver Whale, a Web browser
 The Whale, a housing project by Danish West 8
 Waterfront Historic Area League (WHALE)

See also 
 Wael, an Arabic surname
 Wail (disambiguation)
 Wale (disambiguation)
 Wales (disambiguation)
 Wales, a country of the United Kingdom
 WAAL, pronounced "Whale", a New York radio station